The Mississippi Secession Ordinance was written by Lucius Quintus Cincinnatus Lamar (II), who resigned from the U.S. Congress in January 1861. The ordinance was signed by James Z. George and others.

Text of Ordinance:

References

External links 

 Proceedings of the Mississippi State Convention Held January 7th to 26th

Secession crisis of 1860–61
Mississippi in the American Civil War
American Civil War documents
Mississippi
Politics of Mississippi
1861 in Mississippi
1861 documents